Helen Pitts may refer to:

 Helen Pitts Douglass (1838–1903), American suffragist
 Helen Pitts (horse trainer) (born 1974), American racehorse trainer